Žiga Dimec (born 20 February 1993) is a Slovenian professional basketball player for Nishinomiya Storks of the B.League. He also represents the Slovenian national basketball team.

Professional career
Dimec played in youth categories with Zlatorog Laško. For the 2010–11 season he was loaned to Konjice of the Slovenian Second League. From 2011 to 2014 he played with Zlatorog Laško. For the 2014–15 season he moved to Rogaška. In July 2015, he signed with Krka.

On September 3, 2018 Dimec signed three-months deal with Medi Bayreuth.

On November 27, 2018 Dimec signed with Lithuanian team BC Lietkabelis.

On December 1, 2021, he signed with Anwil Włocławek of the PLK.

On August 30, 2022, he signed with Nishinomiya Storks of the B.League.

National team career
With Slovenia's junior national teams, Dimec played at the 2010 FIBA Europe Under-18 Championship, 2011 FIBA Europe Under-18 Championship, 2012 FIBA Europe Under-20 Championship and 2013 FIBA Europe Under-20 Championship.

Dimec became a member of the senior Slovenian national basketball team in 2016. He played at the EuroBasket 2017.

References

External links
Žiga Dimec at aba-liga.com
Žiga Dimec at eurobasket.com
Žiga Dimec at fiba.com

1993 births
Living people
ABA League players
Basketball players at the 2020 Summer Olympics
BC Lietkabelis players
Centers (basketball)
FIBA EuroBasket-winning players
KK Cedevita Olimpija players
KK Krka players
KK Włocławek players
KK Zlatorog Laško players
Medi Bayreuth players
Nishinomiya Storks players
Olympic basketball players of Slovenia
Slovenian expatriate basketball people in Germany
Slovenian expatriate basketball people in Lithuania
Slovenian expatriate basketball people in Poland
Slovenian men's basketball players
Sportspeople from Celje